Colonel Robert Dow Hunter,  (6 December 1919 – 13 March 2016), known as Robin Hunter, was an officer in the British Army during World War II. Whilst a captain commanding an anti-tank platoon of 5th Battalion, King's Own Scottish Borderers, he knocked out two Tiger tanks in Waldfeucht. For this he received the Military Cross.

Born in London and educated at Christ's Hospital, he joined the Honourable Artillery Company in 1939.

References

1919 births
2016 deaths
British Army personnel of World War II
People educated at Christ's Hospital
Place of death missing
Recipients of the Military Cross
King's Own Scottish Borderers officers
Military personnel from London
King's Own Royal Regiment officers
Honourable Artillery Company soldiers
Royal Artillery officers
Officers of the Order of the British Empire